The siege of Fort Gaines occurred between August 3 and 8, 1864, during the American Civil War. It took place in the Mobile Bay area of Alabama as part of the larger battle of Mobile Bay, and resulted in the surrender of the fort and its defenders.

Siege
Union forces under the command of Maj. Gen. Gordon Granger landed on Dauphin Island, about 7 miles from Fort Gaines, on August 3, and moved against Fort Gaines guarding the western edge of Mobile Bay. Granger's force numbered about 1,500, while 818 troops under the command of Confederate Col. Charles D. Anderson garrisoned the fort. Brig. Gen. Richard L. Page instructed Col. Anderson not to surrender the fort. The fort was supposed to be able to withstand a six-month siege. However, on August 5 the Union fleet ran past Forts Gaines and Morgan, and defeated the Confederate fleet in the bay. The Union fleet had 199 guns to attack with, while the Confederates only held 26 within the walls of Fort Gaines. Anderson, believing he could not hold out against a combined attack by the Union army and navy, chose to surrender the fort on August 8.

Aftermath
With the fall of Fort Gaines, Granger left a garrison at the fort and immediately moved against Fort Morgan to the east. After a two-week siege - the Siege of Fort Morgan - General Page surrendered his fort too on August 23. The loss of these two forts gave control of Mobile Bay and ended the bay's use as a port for the Confederates.

References

Fort Gaines, Siege of
Fort Gaines, Siege of
Fort Gaines
Fort Gaines
Military operations of the American Civil War in Alabama
Mobile County, Alabama
Conflicts in 1864
1864 in Alabama
August 1864 events